The Canadian province of Quebec held municipal elections in several communities in November 1999. Some results from these elections are included on this page.

Bécancour

Gatineau

References

1999
1999 elections in Canada
1999 in Quebec